Kurunta was younger son of the early 13th century BC Hittite king Muwatalli II and cousin of Tudhaliya IV. 
Kurunta was thereby a Hittite prince and king of Tarhuntassa country. It has been suggested that he may have captured the Hittite capital for a very short time during the reign of the Hittite king Tuthaliya IV and declared himself a great king.

Name
His Luwian name Kurunta was after one of the patron gods in the Hittite pantheon. As is customary for late Hittite princes, the Kurunta had also a Hurrian name Ulmi-Teššup (spelled alsoUlmi-Teshup").

The names of the gods and the monarchs are derived from a Proto-Indo-European root *ker-, meaning 'head', 'horn'. In the Anatolian branch, the root originated Hittite kara=war- and Cuneiform Luwian zarwaniya ('pertaining to horn').

Life 

Most of the information about Kurunta is known from two treaties concluded between Hittite state and kingdom of Tarhuntassa. His name is also mentioned in the document known as the Tawagalawa Letter, various seals, and a rock inscription.

According to these documents, Muwatalli gave his son Kurunta to the care of his brother Hattusili III at a young age and Kurunta grew up with the sons of Hattusili. After the death of his father, Kurunta's elder brother Murshili III (Urhi-Tesup) took the throne. A significant event in Muwatalli's reign, which probably influenced the later course of Kurunta's life, was his transfer of the Hittite court to Tarhuntassa in south-central Anatolia.

However, a few years later, when Murshili III and his uncle Hattusili III began a struggle for the throne, Kurunta supported Hattusili. When Hattusili III ascended the throne, he rewarded Kurunta by appointing him vassal king over the city and country of Tarhuntassa in the south of central Anatolia. Tarhuntassa had already served as the Hittite administrative centre during the reign of Kurunta's father Muvatalli II, but after Muvatalli's death the capital was moved back to Hattusa.

In that treaty he bore the name Ulmi-Tessup. However, most of the territory under Tarhuntassa's nominal sway had fallen into the hands of Lukkan warriors acting with support from Ahhiyawa. Kurunta apparently spent all of Hattusili's reign slowly reconquering the lost territory.

A bronze tablet found in Hattusa records a treaty between Tudhaliya IV and Kurunta, wherein Tudhaliya re-grants Kurunta authority over Tarhuntassa. At the time the treaty was sealed, it is clear that Kurunta was still actively reconquering the west, where the city Parha (Classical Perge in Pamphylia) was expected to fall into his hands. For modern scholarship, this treaty is very important, as it has been used to resolve many of the disputes about west Anatolian geography. Further, it is in a state of near perfect preservation, making it a rare and valuable artifact.

Ultimately, Kurunta does not appear to have been content with his fiefdom, and at some point he began using the title of 'Great King' on his seals and on a rock inscription at Hatip, just outside Konya. The seals were found in Hattusa itself, and the bronze tablet was intentionally buried under a paved area near the great southern Sphinx Gate, suggesting some severe breach between the two lands.

The general supposition is that Kurunta usurped the throne from Tudhaliya or his successor Arnuwanda III, although there is no agreement on the course of events. It has also been suggested, for instance, that Kurunta simply declared independence from the Hittite Great Kings, and that Tarhuntassa was then able to maintain that independence for some time.

A Hieroglyphic Luwian inscription on a wall of the southern acropolis of Hattusa mentioned an attack by Suppiluliuma II, son of Tudhaliya IV, on Tarhuntassa. At this time Tarhuntassa likely was ruled by a certain great king known as Hartapu, son of the great king Mursili. This Hartapu is thought to be the son of Mursili III and thus to be the nephew of Kurunta.

Ulmi-Tessup and Kurunta 
There has been scholarly debate about whether Ulmi-Tessup and Kurunta were the same person. Comparisons between the Ulmi-Tessup treaty and the Kurunta treaty have led some scholars to conclude they are the same person, and others to conclude that they are different. For instance, the later treaty between Tudhaliya and Kurunta mentions that in a former treaty, Hattusili had demanded that Kurunta marry a woman of queen Pudu-Hepa's choice; Tudhaliya then revoked that demand. This requirement is not found in the Ulmi-Tessup's treaty, although the beginning of that treaty is missing.

Notes

References
Bryce, Trevor. The Kingdom of the Hittites. Oxford: Oxford UP, 2005. 270-321.

Further reading
"Collins, Billie Jean. The Hittites and Their World, 2007" (Full Text)

External links

Reign of Kurunta

Hittite kings
Tutelary deities